Ángel Parra may refer to:

 Ángel Parra (singer-songwriter), or Luis Ángel Cereceda Parra (1943–2017), Chilean singer-songwriter
 Ángel Parra Jr., or Ángel Cereceda Orrego (born 1966), Chilean guitarist, former member of the band Los Tres, son of the singer-songwriter
 Ángel Parra Trío, Chilean jazz band led by Ángel Parra Jr.
 Ángel Parra (judoka) (born 1983), Spanish judoka